Zhang Jun (born November 26, 1977 in Suzhou, Jiangsu) is a former male badminton player from the People's Republic of China.  He is now a coach with the Chinese national team following his retirement from international play.

Career
As a doubles specialist, the solidly built Zhang Jun won several international men's doubles titles with compatriot Zhang Wei including the Swiss (1998), China (2001), and Thailand (2005) Opens. However, the majority of his titles, and the most prestigious ones, came in mixed doubles with the formidable Gao Ling. These included consecutive gold medals at the 2000 and 2004 Olympic Games, earned by surviving a number of tight matches, particularly in 2000 when they were on the verge of elimination in the semifinals. In similar fashion, Zhang and Gao captured the 2001 IBF World Championships by squeezing past the brilliant Kim Dong-moon and partner Ra Kyung-min 17-16 in the third game. Zhang's other titles with Gao included three victories (2001, 2003, and 2006) at the prestigious All-England Championships; the Badminton Asia Championships in 2002; the China Masters in 2005; and the China (2002, 2003), Japan (2003), Indonesia (2004), Malaysia (2004, 2006), Thailand (2005), Singapore (2005), and German (2006) Opens.

Zhang had the honor of being an Olympic torch carrier at the opening ceremony of the 2008 Beijing Games.

After retirement, Zhang Jun coached the Chinese Badminton National Team. He was promoted to head coach of the national badminton doubles team in 2017, before being selected as vice chairman of the Chinese Badminton Association (CBA) in 2018.

On January 28, 2019, Zhang Jun was elected as the chairman of Chinese Badminton Association.

Zhang Jun, as president of the Chinese Badminton Association, competed with Khunying Patama, his counterpart from the Badminton Association of Thailand and Anton Aditya Subowo, president of Badminton Asia, for the position of BWF deputy president but lost; Patama was elected deputy president in May 2019, during the Sudirman Cup tournament in Nanning, China.

Personal life
Zhang Jun married synchronised swimmer Hu Ni in 2006. Their son was born in 2009. (Zhang Jun's former doubles partner Cai Yun, whom he later also coached, married Hu Ni's teammate Wang Na in 2010.)

Achievements

Olympic Games 
Mixed doubles

World Championships 
Men's doubles

Mixed doubles

Asian Championships 
Men's doubles

Mixed doubles

IBF World Grand Prix
The World Badminton Grand Prix sanctioned by International Badminton Federation (IBF) since 1983.

Men's doubles

References

External links
 
 
 

1977 births
Living people
Badminton players at the 2000 Summer Olympics
Badminton players at the 2004 Summer Olympics
Olympic badminton players of China
Olympic gold medalists for China
Sportspeople from Suzhou
Badminton players from Jiangsu
Olympic medalists in badminton
Asian Games medalists in badminton
Medalists at the 2004 Summer Olympics
Badminton players at the 2002 Asian Games
Badminton players at the 1998 Asian Games
Chinese male badminton players
Medalists at the 2000 Summer Olympics
Chinese badminton coaches
Asian Games silver medalists for China
Asian Games bronze medalists for China
Nanjing Sport Institute alumni
Medalists at the 1998 Asian Games
Medalists at the 2002 Asian Games